The 7th Connecticut Infantry Regiment was an infantry regiment that served in the Union Army during the American Civil War. Because it was in the same brigade as the 7th New Hampshire Volunteer Regiment, both regiments were often jointly called the '77th New England'.

Service
The 7th Connecticut Infantry Regiment was organized at New Haven, Connecticut, on September 13, 1861. It mustered out on July 20, 1865, and discharged at New Haven, Connecticut, on August 11, 1865.

In October and November 1863, the regiment's status changed. It was equipped as a "boat infantry" for the specific purpose of leading an amphibious night assault on Fort Sumter, South Carolina. Although the 7th trained at Folly Island, South Carolina, the project was ultimately ended because it was deemed impractical.

Total strength and casualties
The Regiment, which numbered 1000 men, lost during service 11 Officers and 157 Enlisted men killed and mortally wounded and 4 Officers and 192 Enlisted men by disease. Total 364.

Officers
 Alfred Terry, Major General, raised and led the regiment
 Joseph Roswell Hawley, Lieutenant Colonel
  Benjamin F. Skinner, Captain and company commander
 Thomas T. Minor, Surgeon of the regiment
Seagar S. Atwell, Colonel

Enlisted men
 Frederick H. Dyer, drummer boy
 Pvt. Jerome Dupoy of Redding, Connecticut
 Augustus Riley Robinson of North Haven, Connecticut (1843-1885)
 Pvt. John Rowley of Ridgefield, Connecticut. He was found guilty of the murder of Pvt. Jerome Dupoy by General Court Martial and hung on September 3, 1864, in Petersburg, Virginia.
 Pvt. William Norton, Company C 
 Pvt. Stephen Walkley, Company A of Southington, Connecticut
 Corporal Edward D. Phelps of New Haven, Ct, Company F, 7th Regiment Ct Volunteer Infantry, Captured at Drury's Bluff, 16 May 1864. POW at Andersonville-survived ref: Andersonville, Georgia. Andersonville Prisoner of War Database. Andersonville, GA, USA: National Park Service, Andersonville National Historic Site; Andersonville Prisoners of War [database on-line]. Provo, UT, USA: Ancestry.com Operations Inc, 1999.
 Pvt. Thomas W. Leslie of Southington, enlisted Sept. 5 1861, Co. A, as Pvt. Thomas W. Lesley (subsequently corrected to Leslie), was wounded at the June 16, 1862 Battle of Secessionville, James Island, South Carolina, and was subsequently medically discharged Aug. 8, 1862 and returned home. His recuperation from his wounds was sufficient for him to enlist in 1st CT Cavalry Reg, Co L, on December 21, 1863. At some point he transferred to the Veterans Reserve Corp and stayed there until mustered out in Sept. 1865.
 William H Thorp of Montville, CT. 7th Regiment Connecticut Volunteer Infantry. Company H.
 Private John Cole, Enlisted May 24, 1777. Died June 10, 1778.7th Connecticut Regiment Commanded by Col. Heman Swift

Principal engagements
 Battle of Olustee
 Siege of Fort Pulaski
 Battle of James Island
 Battery Wagner
 Battle of Drewry's Bluff
 Siege of Petersburg
 Battle of Chaffin's Farm
 Second Battle of Fort Fisher

See also
 List of Connecticut Civil War units
 Lists of American Civil War Regiments by State

Notes

References
 Record of Service of Connecticut Men in the Army and Navy of the United States During the War of the Rebellion  - compiled by authority of the General Assembly under the direction of the Adjutants-General Smith, Camp, Barbour, and White. Case, Lockwood, and Brainard Co, 1889 
 Moore, David M. Seventh Regiment Connecticut Volunteer Infantry: Joe Hawley's Boys - In Their Own Words, a Detailed, Illustrated History of the Regiment and Its Service in the Civil War.  Volumes 1 & 2. 2016. 1,204 pages.
 Walkley, Stephen, History of the Seventh Connecticut Volunteer Infantry : Hawley's Brigade, Terry's Division, Tenth Army Corps 1861-1865, 1905.

Units and formations of the Union Army from Connecticut
Civil War
1861 establishments in Connecticut
Military units and formations established in 1861
Military units and formations disestablished in 1865